Road signs in New Zealand are similar to those set by the Vienna Convention on Road Signs and Signals. While New Zealand is not a signatory to the convention, its road signs are generally close in shape and function. New Zealand uses yellow diamond-shaped signs for warnings in common with Australia, the Americas, Ireland, Japan and Thailand. Speed limit signs are a red circle with a white background and the limitation in black, and are in kilometres per hour. There are also some signs unique to New Zealand. Road signs in New Zealand are controlled by the Waka Kotahi NZ Transport Agency and are prescribed in the Land Transport Rule: Traffic Control Devices 2004 and set out in the Traffic Control Devices (TCD) Manual.

Most of these signs were only introduced in 1987, replacing older-style signs with white text on black backgrounds - square with a red border for regulatory signs and diamond with a yellow border. The only signs that remained the same were the Stop sign and the speed limit sign (although the "km/h" legend from metrication was removed). Some of these signs can still be seen on some rural roads.
New Zealand drives on the left.

The Manual of Traffic Signs and Markings specifies that advisory speeds (PW-25) always end in digit "5", however there are some advisory speed signs that do not comply with the Manual and end in zero.

Prohibitory signs

Parking

General advisory

Warning signs 
Warning signs are yellow diamonds and thus follow the American MUTCD design.

Vehicle Mounted

Temporary warning signs

Route markers

Obsolete route markers

Traffic lights

Obsolete signs

Combo signs

Obsolete combo signs

Location Referencing Management System (LRMS)
The NZ Transport Agency (NZTA; Māori: Waka Kotahi) uses a linear location referencing system for its State Highway network, nationwide. This assists roading contractors, safety auditors and emergency services in pin-pointing locations across the country. The LRMS features several types of signs and methods of reference. All KMP's are installed using a calibrated Trip Meter from the beginning of the road. ERP's however, are placed using land surveying equipment.

All LRMS signs are installed on the 'true left' side of the lane or carriageway, this is determined by the left hand side when facing the increasing direction, The increasing direction of travel is the direction in which positive measurements are made. Divided carriageways (roads with concrete berms or centrelines) have an Increasing (I) side and a Decreasing (D) side. This can be seen on LRMS signs in these areas.

Established Route Position (ERP)
Established Route Position signs are used to highlight a special location or bearing on the highway, These are placed routinely along the carriageways, usually every 3 km. They feature the current Reference Station and the number of kilometres from the beginning of that Reference Station. These are required by the NZTA to have an accuracy of less than 3 metres. ERP signs are double-sided and feature a reflective green strip. They also have a small yellow triangle on the post pointing in the roads increasing direction.

Kilometre Marker Post (KMP)
Kilometre Marker Post signs are used to highlight the progression along the highway, These are placed routinely along the carriageways, every 1000 metres. They feature the State Highway Shield, the current Reference Station and the number of kilometres from the beginning of that Reference Station. These are required by the NZTA to have an accuracy of less than 100 metres. KMP signs are on plastic, flexible posts. They are double-sided and feature a reflective black strip.

Reference Station (RS)
Reference Station signs are placed at the change of a Reference Station, or beginning of a Highway. KMP and ERP signs are reset to zero at the beginning of each RS.

See also
Speed limits in New Zealand

References

Road transport in New Zealand
New Zealand

es:Señales de tráfico en Nueva Zelanda
pl:Znaki drogowe w Nowej Zelandii
sv:Vägmärken i Nya Zeeland